Groote Kaap (Great Cape) (also known as the Julianadorp Lighthouse) is a round steel lighthouse painted red with a white light casing on the North Sea coast in the dunes near Julianadorp by the sea, in the municipality of Schagen in the Netherlands. The construction of the tower was completed in 1966. The tower was replaced in 1985.

The tower is 16.8 metres high, and the light has a height of 31 metres above sea level. It is listed with the international number of B0849 and national number of 1482.

Light
 Visibility in nautical miles: white 11; red and green, 8
 Light Character: Oc WRG 10s
 Light source: Halogen, 24V 250W

See also

List of lighthouses in the Netherlands

References

External links
 Information on www.vuurtorens.net

Lighthouses completed in 1966
Lighthouses completed in 1985
Lighthouses in North Holland
Den Helder